The Dell Inspiron E1405 is a portable laptop computer manufactured by Dell Inc. featuring a 14.1 inch (diagonal) display in a 1.5 (H) x 13 (W) x 9.6 (D) inch 2.4 kg clamshell case. This model was also marketed under the name Dell Inspiron 640m.

Configurations
This model also included the following components:

 Processor: Intel Centrino — Core Duo T2050 or T2500, or Core 2 Duo T5500, T5600, T7200, T7400, T7600
 Memory: 1, 2, 3, or 4 GB of shared dual channel DDR2 SDRAM @ 667 MHz.
 Chipset: Intel 945GM Express
 Graphics Processor: integrated Intel GMA 950.
 LCD Display: 14.1" (16:10) - with 1280 × 800 resolution, or with 1280 × 800 resolution and TrueLife, or with 1440 × 900 resolution and TrueLife.
 Storage: 80 or 100 GB SATA HDD at 5400 RPM.
 Optical Drive: tray-load, 8x dual-layer DVD+/-RW or 24x DVD / CD-RW. 
 Battery: 6-cell (56 Whr), or 9-cell (85 Whr) Lithium Ion.
 Wi-Fi Card: mini-card, Dell Wireless 1390 802.11g or 5100 802.11n.
 Bluetooth: Optional Dell Wireless Bluetooth Internal 350.
 I/O ports: 4 USB ports, 1 FireWire port, 1 Fast Ethernet port, 1 56K modem, 1 5-in-1 memory card reader, 1 Express Card slot, 1 VGA output, 1 S-Video output, 1 headphone jack, 1 microphone jack/line-in, and 1 power adapter port.

References
Intel Core Duo Processor T2300 specs
Intel Core Duo Processor T2050 specs
Intel 945GM Express chipset specs
Owner's Manual Inspiron 640/E1405

Inspiron E1405